Glades Central Community High School is a high school located in Belle Glade, Florida. In the 2014–15 school year its enrollment numbered 992 students. It is known for having one of the best high school football teams in the nation, with more football players in the NFL and in the NCAA than any other high school. In fact the New York Times reported that Glades Central had produced more current National Football League players than any other high school in the country with 7 during the 2001 season. The Raiders have won six Florida High School football titles, tying for the second most in state history with Lakeland and University Christian. Their main rivals are the Pahokee Blue Devils. The Blue Devils play the Raiders each year in the so-called "Muck Bowl," one of the most famous high school rivalry games in the nation, which can draw up to 25,000 spectators each year. Glades Central has won 17 out of the 25 games since 1995.

Notable football players from Glades Central High School 
 
 Reidel Anthony – NFL wide receiver, Tampa Bay Buccaneers, Washington Redskins
 Brad Banks – CFL quarterback, Winnipeg Blue Bombers, 2002 Heisman Trophy runner-up
 Kelvin Benjamin – NFL wide receiver, Carolina Panthers, Buffalo Bills
 Travis Benjamin – NFL wide receiver, Cleveland Browns, Los Angeles Chargers, Miami Hurricanes
 Damien Berry – NFL running back, Baltimore Ravens
 Roosevelt Blackmon – NFL defensive back, Green Bay Packers, Cincinnati Bengals
 Jatavis Brown - NFL linebacker, Los Angeles Chargers
 Dinavon Bythwood – NFL defensive end, Cleveland Browns
 Johnnie Dixon – CFL defensive back, Calgary Stampeders
 Rashaad Duncan – NFL defensive end, Tampa Bay Buccaneers, Carolina Panthers, Buffalo Bills
 Jessie Hester – NFL wide receiver, Florida State Seminoles and NFL's St. Louis Rams, Indianapolis Colts, Atlanta Falcons, Los Angeles Raiders
 Santonio Holmes – NFL wide receiver, Pittsburgh Steelers, New York Jets, Chicago Bears, Super Bowl MVP
 James Jackson – NFL running back, Cleveland Browns, Green Bay Packers, Arizona Cardinals
 Cre'Von LeBlanc – NFL defensive back, Philadelphia Eagles
 James Lee – NFL offensive tackle, Tampa Bay Buccaneers
 Ray McDonald – NFL defensive lineman, New England Patriots
 Louis Oliver – defensive back, Miami Dolphins, Cincinnati Bengals
 Johnny Rutledge – NFL linebacker, Arizona Cardinals, Denver Broncos
 Jimmy Spencer – NFL defensive back, New Orleans Saints, Cincinnati Bengals, San Diego Chargers, Denver Broncos
 Fred Taylor – NFL running back, Jacksonville Jaguars (selected to 2008 Pro Bowl), New England Patriots
 Deonte Thompson – NFL wide receiver, Buffalo Bills 
 Clive Walford – NFL tight end, Oakland Raiders
 Rhondy Weston – NFL defensive tackle, Tampa Bay Buccaneers

References

External links
 

High schools in Palm Beach County, Florida
Public high schools in Florida
Educational institutions established in 1995
1995 establishments in Florida